Saint-Ferme is a commune in the Gironde department in Nouvelle-Aquitaine in southwestern France.

Population

Abbey Church of Saint-Ferme
The church features a 12th-century nave and remarkably well-preserved Romanesque capitals, with themes such as Daniel in the Lions' Den and the Fall of Adam and Eve.

See also
Communes of the Gironde department

References

Communes of Gironde